Axia may refer to:
 Axia (gens), an ancient Roman family
 Axia, a division of Telos Systems
 Axia, a Japanese market brand of cassette tapes and optical media by Fujifilm
 Axia (album), the 1985 debut album from Japanese singer Yuki Saito
 Axia (video game), a DOS game made by Dungeon Dwellers Design in 1998
 Axia College
 Axia NetMedia
 Perodua Axia, a car made by Malaysian company Perodua
 Taxonomy
 Axia (moth), a moth genus in the family Cimeliidae
 Axia (worm), a worm genus in the family Macrostomidae

Genus disambiguation pages